Rancho La Purísima Concepción was a  Mexican land grant in present day Santa Clara County, California given in 1840  by Governor Juan Alvarado to José Gorgonio and his son José Ramon, Ohlone Indians.   The granted extended from Matadero Creek (Rancho Corte de Madera) to Adobe Creek and encompassed present day Los Altos Hills.

History
José Gorgonio and his son José Ramon, were Indians at the Mission Santa Clara de Asís.  In 1844 Gorgonio sold the one square league Rancho La Purísima Concepción to Juana Briones de Miranda (1802-1889), the daughter of Marcos Briones, who came with his father Ygnacio Briones to San Diego in 1769 and Maria Tapia, who came with her parents to San Francisco with the Anza Party.   Her brother, Gregorio Briones, was grantee of Rancho Las Baulines.  She married Apolinario Miranda, a Presidio of San Francisco soldier, in 1820, and later gained a legal separation. The name translates literally to "The land of the Immaculate Conception".

With the cession of California to the United States following the Mexican-American War, the 1848 Treaty of Guadalupe Hidalgo provided that the land grants would be honored.  As required by the Land Act of 1851, a claim for Rancho La Purísima Concepción was filed with the Public Land Commission in 1852, and the grant was patented to Juana Briones de Miranda in 1871.

Juana Briones sold about three quartes of her rancho in 1861 to Martin Murphy Jr. (1807-1884) of Sunnyvale, who had come to California with the Stephens-Townsend-Murphy Party in 1844.  She gave the remaining  of her rancho to her children, who bore their father’s name, Miranda.

Historic sites of the Rancho
Site of Juana Briones de Miranda Home.

References

Purisima Concepcion, La
La Purísima Concepción
Los Altos, California
La Purísima Concepción